Dana Murphy is an American politician who served as a member of the Oklahoma Corporation Commission from 2009 to 2023. Murphy was a candidate for Lieutenant Governor of Oklahoma in the 2018 election.

Career
Murphy defeated Democrat Jim Roth, who was appointed in 2007 by Democratic Governor of Oklahoma Brad Henry, in a 2008 special election to fill the seat vacated by Republican Denise Bode.

Murphy ran for a full term in 2010 and handily won the primary election.  As no Democrat or independent candidate filed, Murphy thus retained her seat.

Murphy was elected Chairman by her fellow Commissioners effective February 1, 2017.

On July 27, 2017, Murphy announced that she would run for Lieutenant Governor in the 2018 election.

Electoral history

References

External links
 

21st-century American politicians
21st-century American women politicians
Candidates in the 2018 United States elections
Corporation Commissioners of Oklahoma
Living people
Oklahoma Republicans
People from Woodward, Oklahoma
Women in Oklahoma politics
Year of birth missing (living people)